Berzelianite is a rare copper selenide mineral with the formula Cu2Se. It occurs as thin dendritic crusts or as fine-grained inclusions. It crystallizes in the isometric system, unlike its dimorph, bellidoite, which crystallizes in the tetragonal system. The crystals are opaque and slightly malleable.

Occurrence and name 
Berzelianite was first identified at the Skrikerum Mine (also spelled as Skrickerum Mine) in Valdemarsvik, Östergötland, Sweden in 1850. 

It was named by James Dwight Dana to honor Jöns Jakob Berzelius, a Swedish chemist who is seen as the father of analytical chemistry. He invented chemical symbol notation and discovered the elements cerium, selenium, silicon, and thorium. 

Berzelianite often occurs together with eucairite, clausthalite, tiemannite, umangite, klockmannite, aguilarite, crookesite, athabascaite, stromeyerite, polybasite, pearceite, gold, uraninite, pyrite, marcasite, calcite.

See also 
 List of minerals
 List of minerals named after people

References 

Selenide minerals
Copper(I) minerals
Cubic minerals
Minerals in space group 225